Euphorbia geroldii commonly called Gerold's Spurge or Thornless Crown of Thorns a species of plant in the family Euphorbiaceae. It is endemic to Madagascar.  Its natural habitat is subtropical or tropical dry forests. It is threatened by habitat loss.

References

Endemic flora of Madagascar
geroldii
Critically endangered plants
Taxonomy articles created by Polbot